One Day International (ODI) cricket is played between international cricket teams who are Full Members of the International Cricket Council (ICC) as well as the top four Associate members. Unlike Test matches, ODIs consist of one inning per team, having a limit in the number of overs, currently 50 overs per innings – although in the past this has been 55 or 60 overs. ODI cricket is List-A cricket, so statistics and records set in ODI matches also count toward List-A records. The earliest match recognised as an ODI was played between England and Australia in January 1971; since when there have been over 4,000 ODIs played by 28 teams. 
This is a list of England ODI records and is based on the List of One Day International cricket records.

Key
The top five records are listed for each category, except for the team wins, losses, draws and ties, all round records and the partnership records. Tied records for fifth place are also included. Explanations of the general symbols and cricketing terms used in the list are given below. Specific details are provided in each category where appropriate. All records include matches played for England only, and are correct .

Team records

Overall record

Team wins, losses, draws and ties 
, England has played 775 ODI matches resulting in 389 victories, 347 defeats, 9 ties and 30 no results for an overall winning percentage of 52.81

Team scoring records

Most runs in an innings
The highest innings total scored in ODIs came in the match between England and the Netherlands in June 2022. Playing in the first ODI at VRA Cricket Ground in Amstelveen, the touring side posted a total of 498/4.

Fewest runs in an innings
The lowest innings total scored in ODIs has been scored twice. Zimbabwe were dismissed for 35 by Sri Lanka during the third ODI in Sri Lanka's tour of Zimbabwe in April 2004 and USA were dismissed for same score by Nepal in the sixth ODI of the 2020 ICC Cricket World League 2 in Nepal in February 2020. The lowest score in ODI history for England is 86 scored against Australia in the 2001 NatWest Series.

Most runs conceded an innings
The second match of the 2015 ODI series against New Zealand saw England concede their highest innings total of 398/5.

Fewest runs conceded in an innings
The lowest score conceded by England for a full inning is 45 scored by Canada in the 1979 Cricket World Cup.

Most runs aggregate in a match
The highest match aggregate scored in ODIs came in the match between South Africa and Australia in the fifth ODI of March 2006 series at Wanderers Stadium, Johannesburg when South Africa scored 438/9 in response to Australia's 434/4. The second ODI on tour of West Indies against West Indies in National Cricket Stadium, St. George's saw a total of 807 runs being scored.

Fewest runs aggregate in a match
The lowest match aggregate in ODIs is 71 when USA were dismissed for 35 by Nepal in the sixth ODI of the 2020 ICC Cricket World League 2 in Nepal in February 2020. The lowest match aggregate in ODI history for England is 91 scored at the 1979 Cricket World Cup against Canada.

Result records
An ODI match is won when one side has scored more runs than the total runs scored by the opposing side during their innings. If both sides have completed both their allocated innings and the side that fielded last has the higher aggregate of runs, it is known as a win by runs. This indicates the number of runs that they had scored more than the opposing side. If the side batting last wins the match, it is known as a win by wickets, indicating the number of wickets that were still to fall.

Greatest win margins (by runs)
The greatest winning margin by runs in ODIs was New Zealand's victory over Ireland by 290 runs in the only ODI of the 2008 England tour. The largest victory recorded by England was during the aforementioned match against Australia in June 2018 when they won by 242 runs.

Greatest win margins (by balls remaining)
The greatest winning margin by balls remaining in ODIs was England's victory over Canada by 8 wickets with 277 balls remaining in the 1979 Cricket World Cup.

Greatest win margins (by wickets)
A total of 55 matches have ended with chasing team winning by 10 wickets with West Indies winning by such margins a record 10 times. England have won a match by such margin on 6 occasions, including chasing a score of 255 against Sri Lanka in June 2016, which is the third highest score chased without losing a wicket, behind South Africa and Australia.

Highest successful run chases
South Africa holds the record for the highest successful run chase which they achieved when they scored 438/9 in response to Australia's 434/9. England's highest winning total while chasing is 364/4 in a run chase against West Indies at Kensington Oval, Bridgetown during the 2019 ODI series in West Indies. They have also made the higher scores in defeats.

Narrowest win margins (by runs)
The narrowest run margin victory is by 1 run which has been achieved in 31 ODI's with Australia winning such games a record 6 times. England's has achieved a victory by 1 run on two occasions, once via revised target.

Narrowest win margins (by balls remaining)
The narrowest winning margin by balls remaining in ODIs is by winning of the last ball which has been achieved 36 times with both South Africa winning seven times. England has achieved a victory by this margin on three occasions.

Narrowest win margins (by wickets)
The narrowest margin of victory by wickets is 1 wicket which has settled 55 such ODIs. Both West Indies and New Zealand have recorded such victory on eight occasions. England has won the match by a margin of one wicket on seven occasions.

Greatest loss margins (by runs)
England's biggest defeat by runs was against Australia at the Melbourne Cricket Ground during the 2022–23 ODI series.

Greatest loss margins (by balls remaining)
The greatest winning margin by balls remaining in ODIs was England's victory over Canada by 8 wickets with 277 balls remaining in the 1979 Cricket World Cup. The largest defeat suffered by England was against West Indies in West Indies when they lost by 7 wickets with 227 balls remaining.

Greatest loss margins (by wickets)
England have lost an ODI match by a margin of 10 wickets on five occasions with most recent being during the Quarter-final of the 2011 Cricket World Cup against Sri Lanka in March 2001 at Colombo (SSC).

Narrowest loss margins (by runs)
The narrowest loss of England in terms of runs is by 1 run suffered against South Africa at Cape Town during the 2000 ODI Series.

Narrowest loss margins (by balls remaining)
The narrowest winning margin by balls remaining in ODIs is by winning of the last ball which has been achieved 36 times with both South Africa winning seven times. England has suffered loss by this margin two times.

Narrowest loss margins (by wickets)
England has suffered defeat by 1 wicket five times.

Tied matches 
A tie can occur when the scores of both teams are equal at the conclusion of play, provided that the side batting last has completed their innings. 
There have been 37 ties in ODIs history with England involved in 9 such games.

Individual records

Batting records

Most career runs
A run is the basic means of scoring in cricket.
India's Sachin Tendulkar, with 18,246, has scored the most runs in ODIs, ahead of Kumar Sangakkara of Sri Lanka with 14,234 and Ricky Ponting of Australia with 13,704. Eoin Morgan (the previous captain of the England limited-overs team) is the leading English player on this list with 6,957 runs.

Fastest to multiples of 1000 runs

Highest individual score
The fourth ODI of the Sri Lanka's tour of India in 2014 saw Rohit Sharma score the highest Individual score. Jason Roy holds the English record when he scored 180 against Australia in the first ODI of the 2018 series.

Highest individual score – progression of record

Highest career average
A batsman's batting average is the total number of runs they have scored divided by the number of times they have been dismissed.

Most half-centuries
A half-century is a score of between 50 and 99 runs. Statistically, once a batsman's score reaches 100, it is no longer considered a half-century but a century.

Sachin Tendulkar of India has scored the most half-centuries in ODIs with 96. He is followed by the Sri Lanka's Kumar Sangakkara on 93, South Africa's Jacques Kallis on 86 and India's Rahul Dravid and Pakistan's Inzamam-ul-Haq on 83. Eoin Morgan is the leading English player on this list, with 42 half-centuries.

Most centuries
A century is a score of 100 or more runs in a single innings.

Tendulkar has also scored the most centuries in ODIs with 49. Joe Root has the most centuries for England.

Most sixes

Most fours

Highest strike rates
Andre Russell of West Indies holds the record for highest strike rate, with minimum 500 balls faced qualification, with 130.22. Jos Buttler is the Englishman with the highest strike rate.

Highest strike rates in an innings
James Franklin of New Zealand's strike rate of 387.50 during his 31* off 8 balls against Canada during 2011 Cricket World Cup is the world record for highest strike rate in an innings. Moeen Ali during his innings of 31* off 9 balls against Afghanistan at the 2019 Cricket World Cup recorded a strike rate of 344.44, the highest for an England's batsmen.

Most runs in a calendar year
Tendulkar holds the record for most runs scored in a calendar year with 1894 runs scored in 1998.Jonathan Trott scored 1315 runs in 2011, the most for an English batsmen in a year.

Most runs in a series
The 1980-81 Benson & Hedges World Series Cup in Australia saw Greg Chappell set the record for the most runs scored in a single series scoring 685 runs. He is followed by Sachin Tendulkar with 673 runs scored in the 2003 Cricket World Cup. David Gower has scored the most runs in a series for an English batsmen, when he scored 563 runs in the Benson & Hedges World Series in 1982-83.

Most ducks
A duck refers to a batsman being dismissed without scoring a run. 
Sanath Jayasuriya has scored the equal highest number of ducks in ODIs with 34 such knocks. Eoin Morgan holds this dubious record for England with 15 ducks.

Bowling records

Most career wickets
A bowler takes the wicket of a batsman when the form of dismissal is bowled, caught, leg before wicket, stumped or hit wicket. If the batsman is dismissed by run out, obstructing the field, handling the ball, hitting the ball twice or timed out the bowler does not receive credit.

England's James Anderson is the leading England bowler on the list of leading ODI wicket-takers.

Fastest to multiples of wickets

Best figures in an innings

Best figures in an innings – progression of record

Best career average
A bowler's bowling average is the total number of runs they have conceded divided by the number of wickets they have taken.
Afghanistan's Rashid Khan holds the record for the best career average in ODIs with 18.54. Joel Garner, West Indian cricketer, and a member of the highly regarded late 1970s and early 1980s West Indies cricket teams, is second behind Rashid with an overall career average of 18.84 runs per wicket. Andrew Flintoff of England is the highest ranked English when the qualification of 2000 balls bowled is followed.

Best career economy rate
A bowler's economy rate is the total number of runs they have conceded divided by the number of overs they have bowled.
West Indies' Joel Garner, holds the ODI record for the best career economy rate with 3.09. England's Bob Willis, with a rate of 3.28 runs per over conceded over his 64-match ODI career, is the highest English on the list when the minimum qualification of 2,000 balls bowled is kept.

Best career strike rate
A bowler's strike rate is the total number of balls they have bowled divided by the number of wickets they have taken.
The top bowler with the best ODI career strike rate is South Africa's Lungi Ngidi with strike rate of 23.2 balls per wicket. England's Liam Plunkett is the highest ranked English in this list.

Most four-wickets (& over) hauls in an innings
James Anderson and Chris Woakes are joint-tenth (along with five other players) on the list of most four-wicket hauls, with Pakistan's Waqar Younis and Sri Lanka's Muttiah Muralitharan leading this category in ODIs.

Most five-wicket hauls in a match
A five-wicket haul refers to a bowler taking five wickets in a single innings.
Chris Woakes is the highest ranked English on the list of most five-wicket hauls which is headed by Pakistan's Waqar Younis with 13 such hauls.

Best economy rates in an inning
The best economy rate in an inning, when a minimum of 30 balls are delivered by the player, is West Indies player Phil Simmons economy of 0.30 during his spell of 3 runs for 4 wickets in 10 overs against Pakistan at Sydney Cricket Ground in the 1991–92 Australian Tri-Series. Dermot Reeve holds the English record during his spell in 1992 Cricket World Cup game against Pakistan at Adelaide.

Best strike rates in an inning
The best strike rate in an inning, when a minimum of 4 wickets are taken by the player, is shared by Sunil Dhaniram of Canada, Paul Collingwood of England and Virender Sehwag of India, who all achieved a strike rate of 4.2 balls per wicket.

Worst figures in an innings
The worst figures in an ODI came in the 5th One Day International between South Africa at home to Australia in 2006. Australia's Mick Lewis returned figures of 0/113 from his 10 overs in the second innings of the match. The worst figures by an English is 0/97 that came off the bowling of Steve Harmison in the 2006 ODI Series against Sri Lanka at Headingley, Leeds.

Most runs conceded in a match
Mick Lewis also holds the dubious distinction of most runs conceded in an ODI during the aforementioned match. Harmison in the above-mentioned spell holds the English record.

Most wickets in a calendar year
Pakistan's Saqlain Mushtaq holds the record for most wickets taken in a year when he took 69 wickets in 1997 in 36 ODIs. England's John Emburey is the highest English bowler on the list having taken 43 wickets in 1987.

Most wickets in a series
1998–99 Carlton and United Series involving Australia, England and Sri Lanka and the 2019 Cricket World Cup saw the records set for the most wickets taken by a bowler in an ODI series when Australian pacemen Glenn McGrath and Mitchell Starc achieved a total of 27 wickets during the series, respectively. England's Jofra Archer is joint 26th with his 20 wickets taken during the 2019 Cricket World Cup.

Hat-trick
In cricket, a hat-trick occurs when a bowler takes three wickets with consecutive deliveries. The deliveries may be interrupted by an over bowled by another bowler from the other end of the pitch, but must be three consecutive deliveries by the individual bowler in the same match. Only wickets attributed to the bowler count towards a hat-trick; run outs do not count.
In ODI history there have been just 49 hat-tricks, the first achieved by Jalal-ud-Din for Pakistan against Australia in 1982.

Wicket-keeping records
The wicket-keeper is a specialist fielder who stands behind the stumps being guarded by the batsman on strike and is the only member of the fielding side allowed to wear gloves and leg pads.

Most career dismissals
A wicket-keeper can be credited with the dismissal of a batsman in two ways, caught or stumped. A fair catch is taken when the ball is caught fully within the field of play without it bouncing after the ball has touched the striker's bat or glove holding the bat, Laws 5.6.2.2 and 5.6.2.3 state that the hand or the glove holding the bat shall be regarded as the ball striking or touching the bat while a stumping occurs when the wicket-keeper puts down the wicket while the batsman is out of his ground and not attempting a run.
Current England wicket-keeper Jos Buttler has made the ninth-most dismissals in ODIs as a designated wicket-keeper, with Sri Lanka's Kumar Sangakkara and Australian Adam Gilchrist heading the list.

Most career catches
Buttler is ninth on the list of most catches in ODIs as a designated wicket-keeper.

Most career stumpings
Buttler is ranked 11th in stumpings, in a list headed by MS Dhoni of India followed by Sri Lankans Sangakkara and Romesh Kaluwitharana.

Most dismissals in an innings
Ten wicket-keepers on 15 occasions have taken six dismissals in a single innings in an ODI. Adam Gilchrist of Australia alone has done it six times. Buttler, Stewart and Prior have also achieved this feat once in their career.

Most dismissals in a series
Gilchrist also holds the ODIs record for the most dismissals taken by a wicket-keeper in a series. He made 27 dismissals during the 1998-99 Carlton & United Series. English record is held by Geraint Jones when he made 20 dismissals during the 2005 Natwest Series.

Fielding records

Most career catches
Caught is one of the nine methods a batsman can be dismissed in cricket. The majority of catches are caught in the slips, located behind the batsman, next to the wicket-keeper, on the off side of the field. Most slip fielders are top order batsmen.

Sri Lanka's Mahela Jayawardene holds the record for the most catches in ODIs by a non-wicket-keeper with 218, followed by Ricky Ponting of Australia on 160 and Indian Mohammad Azharuddin with 156.Paul Collingwood is the leading catcher for England.

Most catches in an innings
South Africa's Jonty Rhodes is the only fielder to have taken five catches in an innings. The feat of taking 4 catches in an innings has been achieved by 42 fielders on 44 occasions, with Chris Woakes being the only England fielder to do so.

Most catches in a series
The 2019 Cricket World Cup, which was won by England for the first time, saw the record set for the most catches taken by a non-wicket-keeper in an ODI series. Englishman batsman and captain of the England Test team Joe Root took 13 catches in the series as well as scored 556 runs.

All-round records

1000 runs and 100 wickets
A total of 65 players have achieved the double of 1000 runs and 100 wickets in their ODI career.

Other records

Most career matches
India's Sachin Tendulkar holds the record for the most ODI matches played with 463, with former captains Mahela Jayawardene and Sanath Jayasuriya being second and third having represented Sri Lanka on 443 and 441 occasions, respectively. Eoin Morgan is the most experienced England player having represented the team on 225 occasions.

Most consecutive career matches
Tendulkar also holds the record for the most consecutive ODI matches played with 185. He broke Richie Richardson's long standing record of 132 matches.

Most matches as captain

Ricky Ponting, who led the Australian cricket team from 2002 to 2012, holds the record for the most matches played as captain in ODIs with 230 (including 1 as captain of ICC World XI team). 2019 Cricket World Cup winning skipper Eoin Morgan has led England in 126 matches.

Youngest players on debut
The youngest player to play in an ODI match is claimed to be Hasan Raza at the age of 14 years and 233 days. Making his debut for Pakistan against Zimbabwe on 30 October 1996, there is some doubt as to the validity of Raza's age at the time. The youngest England player to play in an ODI was Rehan Ahmed who at the age of 18 years and 205 days debuted in the third ODI of the series against Bangladesh in March 2023.

Oldest players on debut
The Netherlands batsmen Nolan Clarke is the oldest player to appear in an ODI match. Playing in the 1996 Cricket World Cup against New Zealand in 1996 at Reliance Stadium in Vadodara, England he was aged 47 years and 240 days. Norman Gifford is the oldest English ODI debutant when he played for England during the 1984–85 Four-Nations Cup at the Sharjah Cricket Stadium, Sharjah, United Arab Emirates.

Oldest players
The Netherlands batsmen Nolan Clarke is the oldest player to appear in an ODI match. Playing in the 1996 Cricket World Cup against South Africa in 1996 at Rawalpindi Cricket Stadium in Rawalpindi, Pakistan he was aged 47 years and 257 days.

Partnership records
In cricket, two batsmen are always present at the crease batting together in a partnership. This partnership will continue until one of them is dismissed, retires or the innings comes to a close.

Highest partnerships by wicket
A wicket partnership describes the number of runs scored before each wicket falls. The first wicket partnership is between the opening batsmen and continues until the first wicket falls. The second wicket partnership then commences between the not out batsman and the number three batsman. This partnership continues until the second wicket falls. The third wicket partnership then commences between the not out batsman and the new batsman. This continues down to the tenth wicket partnership. When the tenth wicket has fallen, there is no batsman left to partner so the innings is closed.

Highest partnerships by runs
The highest ODI partnership by runs for any wicket is held by the West Indian pairing of Chris Gayle and Marlon Samuels who put together a second wicket partnership of 372 runs during the 2015 Cricket World Cup against Zimbabwe in February 2015. This broke the record of 331 runs set by Indian pair of Sachin Tendulkar and Rahul Dravid against New Zealand in 1999

Highest overall partnership runs by a pair

Umpiring records

Most matches umpired
An umpire in cricket is a person who officiates the match according to the Laws of Cricket. Two umpires adjudicate the match on the field, whilst a third umpire has access to video replays, and a fourth umpire looks after the match balls and other duties. The records below are only for on-field umpires.

Currently active Aleem Dar of Pakistan holds the record for the most ODI matches umpired with 229. He is followed by Rudi Koertzen of South Africa and New Zealand's Billy Bowden, who officiated in 209 and 200 matches respectively. The most experienced English is David Shepherd who stood in 172 ODI matches.

See also

List of One Day International cricket records
List of England Test cricket records
List of England Twenty20 International records

Notes

References

One Day International cricket records
Lists of English cricket records and statistics